The Aegon British Tennis Awards are a set of monthly awards that are presented to current tennis players, who represent Great Britain and are deemed to have made the best performance, and/or contribution to British tennis.

They were first awarded for January 2009. Each month three categories are presented to the recipients of Senior Player, Junior Player and Coach.

The Player and Junior Player Awards are selected by the performance board in the Player Team meeting at the National Tennis Centre. The board decide this from nominations given by top LTA national coaches, taking into consideration a combination of ranking improvements, outstanding performance and significant results.

The Coach of the Month is selected by the Head of Coaching and his team from the nominations put forward by LTA Licensed coaches. The winning coach being deemed to have had the greatest impact on British Tennis in the previous month.

Award winners

2009

2010

2011

2012

2013

References

External links
 Aegon Awards at LTA

Tennis awards
Awards established in 2009